Stephen Yablo is a Canadian-born American philosopher. He is David W. Skinner Professor of Philosophy at the Massachusetts Institute of Technology (MIT), and taught previously at the University of Michigan, Ann Arbor. He specializes in the philosophy of logic, philosophy of mind, metaphysics, philosophy of language, and philosophy of mathematics.

Biography
He was born in Toronto, on 30 September 1957, to a Polish father Saul Yablo and Romanian-Canadian mother Gloria Yablo (née Herman), both Jewish. He is married to fellow MIT philosopher Sally Haslanger.

His Ph.D. is from University of California, Berkeley, where he worked with Donald Davidson and George Myro. In 2012, he was elected a Fellow of the American Academy of Arts and Sciences.

Philosophical work
In 1993, he published a short paper showing that a liar-like paradox can be generated without self-reference. He has published a number of influential papers in philosophy of mind, philosophy of language, and metaphysics, and gave the John Locke Lectures at Oxford in 2012, which formed the basis for his book Aboutness, which one reviewer described as "an important and far-reaching book that philosophers will be discussing for a long time."

Books
Thoughts (Philosophical Papers, volume 1) (Oxford University Press, 2009)
Things (Philosophical Papers, volume 2) (Oxford University Press, 2010)
Aboutness (Princeton University Press, 2014).

References

External links
"Paradox Without Self-Reference" - Analysis, vol. 53 (1993), pp. 251–52
"Mental Causation" - The Philosophical Review, vol. 101, issue 2 (1992), pp. 245–280
"Go Figure: A Path Through Fictionalism"
Interview at 3:AM Magazine
Interview at What is it like to be a philosopher?

Analytic philosophers
American logicians
Philosophers of mathematics
Philosophers of mind
Philosophers of language
Living people
Fellows of the American Academy of Arts and Sciences
University of Michigan faculty
Year of birth missing (living people)